Gregory H. Watkins is an American sound engineer. He won an Academy Award for Best Sound and has been nominated for two more in the same category. He has worked on over 150 films since 1982.

Selected filmography
Watkins won an Academy Award for Best Sound and has been nominated for another two:

Won
 Dances with Wolves (1990)

Nominated
 Born on the Fourth of July (1989)
 Crimson Tide (1995)

References

External links

Year of birth missing (living people)
Living people
American audio engineers
Best Sound Mixing Academy Award winners
Place of birth missing (living people)